Lieutenant-General Sir Roger William Henry Palmer, 5th Baronet (1832–1910) was a senior officer in the British Army and the Anglo-Irish Conservative MP for Mayo. Sir Roger was the last of the Palmer baronets of Castle Lackin, Co. Mayo, who owned, in addition to some 115,000 acres of land, Kenure House, Rush, County Dublin, Castle Lackin in Mayo, Cefn Park in Wrexham and Glenisland House in Maidenhead.

He was the son of Sir William Henry Roger Palmer, Bt and the great-grandson of Sir Roger Palmer of Mayo, who was MP (1768-1783) for Portarlington in the Irish Parliament. His only sibling Ellen married Archie Peel, a nephew of the UK Prime minister. He was educated at Eton and joined the Army.

He served in the Crimea War with the 11th Hussars and took part in the Charge of the Light Brigade of 1854. He exchanged to the 2nd Life Guards in 1856 (until 1870)  and was placed on the retired list in 1881. He was granted the colonelcy of the 20th Hussars from 1891 until his death in 1910.

During the Irish Famine, he was known to have evicted many tenants.

He was the Anglo-Irish Conservative MP for Mayo from 1857 until 1865. He succeeded his father in 1869 and the same year built Glen Island House on an island in the Thames near Taplow.  He was High Sheriff of Mayo in 1888.

On his death, Kenure Park passed to Colonel Roderick Henry Fenwick-Palmer. Sir Roger had married Gertrude Millicent, daughter of the Rev. Plumer Rooper, who survived him, dying in 1929.

In popular culture
In a 2014 episode of Who Do You Think You Are? actress Julie Walters learns that her Irish great-grandfather, Anthony Clarke, was a tenant at will of Palmer's, living on and cultivating 43 acres of land in County Mayo owned by Sir Roger.

References

1832 births
1910 deaths
People educated at Eton College
11th Hussars officers
Irish Conservative Party MPs
19th-century Irish people
Politicians from County Mayo
Members of the Parliament of the United Kingdom for County Mayo constituencies (1801–1922)
UK MPs 1857–1859
UK MPs 1859–1865
British Life Guards officers
20th Hussars officers
British Army generals
British Army personnel of the Crimean War
Baronets in the Baronetage of Ireland
High Sheriffs of Mayo